Government Museum may refer to:

 Government Museum, Chennai
 Government Museum, Karur
 Government Museum (Bangalore)
 Government Museum, Mathura
 Government Museum, Tiruchirappalli
 Cuddalore Government Museum
 Government Museum, Pudukkottai
 Government Museum (Shivappa Nayaka Palace), Shimoga